The Mantaro mine is a large mine located in the Junín Region. Mantaro represents one of the largest phosphates reserve in Peru having estimated reserves of 1.14 billion tonnes of ore grading 9% P2O5.

See also 
List of mines in Peru

Zinc mining

References 

Phosphate mines in Peru